Katagelasticism is a psychological condition in which a person excessively enjoys laughing at others. Katagelasticists actively seek and establish situations in which they can laugh at others (at the expense of these people). There is a broad variety of things that katagelasticists would do—starting from harmless pranks or word plays to truly embarrassing and even harmful, mean-spirited jokes. They would be of the opinion that laughing at others is part of the daily life and if others do not like being laughed at, they should just fight back. For katagelasticists, it is fun laughing at others and there is almost nothing that might hinder them from doing so. For them, some people might even provoke getting laughed at and deserve being laughed at. This condition often makes it difficult for sufferers to gain and maintain acquaintances and romantic partners.

Research
The first academic paper to investigate this phenomenon was published in 2009. Along with gelotophobia and gelotophilia, it can be measured through a questionnaire that consists of 45 questions (the PhoPhiKat-45; the PhoPhiKat-30 is a short form that consists of 30 items). This is a reliable and valid instrument that has been used in a variety of studies. The questionnaire is also online for a free self-assessment in German here.

Gelotophobia, gelotophilia, and katagelasticism describe three different stances towards laughter and laughing at. Empirical studies with the PhoPhiKat-45 show that people can not at the same time fear and like being laughed at (i.e., be gelotophobes and gelotophiles at the same time). However, there is at least a subgroup of gelotophobes that enjoys laughing at others, despite knowing how harmful this can be. Finally, gelotophilia and katagelasticism are positively related; that is, those who enjoy being laughed at might also enjoy laughing at others.

See also
Schadenfreude – pleasure derived from the misfortunes of others

References

Further reading
 Proyer, R. T., & Ruch, W. (2010). Dispositions towards ridicule and being laughed at: Current research on gelotophobia, gelotophilia, and katagelasticism (Editorial to Special Issue)..  Psychological Test and Assessment Modeling, 52(1), 49–59.

External links
 Gelotophobia Assessment and Research Association Website
 Website on Gelotophobia, by Tracey Platt
 Special Issue on Gelotophobia in Humor: International Journal of Humor Research (1-2/2008)
 When Humor Humiliates, by Susan Guidos (Science news)
 Special issue in Psychological Test and Assessment modeling entitled Dispositions towards ridicule and being laughed at: Current research on gelotophobia, gelotophilia, and katagelasticism; open access

Anxiety disorders
Laughter